The 1950–51 NBA season was the Warriors' 5th season in the NBA.

NBA draft

Roster

|-
! colspan="2" style="background-color: #0000FF;  color: #FFD700; text-align: center;" | Philadelphia Warriors 1950–51 roster
|- style="background-color: #FFD700; color: #FFFFFF;   text-align: center;"
! Players !! Coaches
|-
| valign="top" |

! Pos. !! # !! Nat. !! Name !! Ht. !! Wt. !! From
|-

Regular season

Season standings

x – clinched playoff spot

Record vs. opponents

Game log

Playoffs

|- align="center" bgcolor="#ffcccc"
| 1
| March 20
| Syracuse
| L 89–91 (OT)
| Joe Fulks (30)
| Ed Mikan (16)
| George Senesky (10)
| Philadelphia Arena
| 0–1
|- align="center" bgcolor="#ffcccc"
| 2
| March 22
| @ Syracuse
| L 78–90
| Joe Fulks (22)
| Arizin, Phillip (8)
| Andy Phillip (9)
| State Fair Coliseum
| 0–2
|-

Awards and records
 Paul Arizin, NBA All-Star Game
 Joe Fulks, NBA All-Star Game
 Andy Phillip, NBA All-Star Game
 Joe Fulks, All-NBA Second Team

References

See also
 1950–51 NBA season

Golden State Warriors seasons
Philadelphia